The 2003 National Leagues (known as the LHF National Leagues due to sponsorship) are the second, third and fourth divisions of rugby league played in the United Kingdom.

National Leagues One and Two were made up of the 18 clubs that competed in the Northern Ford Premiership during the previous season, plus the London Skolars and the York City Knights. National League Three consisted of ten additional teams from the amateur leagues. There was no automatic promotion and relegation with National League Two, but the RFL hoped to introduce this in the future.

National League One
National League One was won by Salford City Reds, and won promotion to the Super League after defeating runners-up the Leigh Centurions in the play-off final. The Dewsbury Rams were relegated to National Two.

Table

Playoffs

Grand Final

National League Two
National League Two was won by the Sheffield Eagles, but lost to the Keighley Cougars in the play-off final.

Table

Playoffs

Grand Final

National League Three
National League Three was won by Bradford Dudley Hill, with the play-offs being won by the Woolston Rovers (Warrington).

Table

Playoffs

References

External links
Rugby Football League

See also
Rugby League Championships

RFL League 1
Rugby Football League Championship
National Leagues